Zahed Kola (also Romanized as Zāhed Kolā, Zāhed Kalā, and Zēhed Kolā) is a village in Nowkand Kola Rural District, in the Central District of Qaem Shahr County, Mazandaran Province, Iran. At the 2006 census, its population was 257, in 59 families.

References 

Populated places in Qaem Shahr County